Rectoris mutabilis is a species of cyprinid of the genus Rectoris. It is considered harmless to humans.

References

Cyprinid fish of Asia
Freshwater fish of China
Fish of Vietnam